Spaventa is an Italian surname. Notable people with the surname include:

Bertrando Spaventa (1817–1883), Italian philosopher
Luigi Spaventa (1934–2013), Italian academic
Silvio Spaventa (1822–1893), Italian journalist, politician and statesman

Italian-language surnames